The Sister Study is a nationwide effort, conducted by the National Institute of Environmental Health Sciences, one of the National Institutes of Health of the U.S. Department of Health and Human Services to learn how the environment and genes may affect the chances of getting breast cancer. Over 10 years, the study followed 50,000 sisters of women who have had breast cancer, in hopes of finding the environmental and genetic causes of the disease.

Sister Study participants were women ages 35 to 74. Women were eligible to participate if their sister (living or deceased), related to them by blood, had breast cancer; they had never had breast cancer themselves, and they lived in the United States or Puerto Rico. The Sister Study was available in English and Spanish. Recruitment for the study began in 2004 and closed in 2009.

The principal investigators for the study are Dale Sandler and Clarice Weinberg and the study was overseen by Marian Johnson-Thompson. Organizations in partnership with the Sister Study included the American Cancer Society, the Intercultural Cancer Council, the National Center on Minority Health and Health Disparities of the National Institutes of Health, Sisters Network Inc., Y-ME National Breast Cancer Organization, Susan G. Komen for the Cure, and Breast Cancer Network of Strength.

References

External links 
 The Sister Study: Home

Research projects
Environmental health organizations
Breast cancer organizations